Dave Williams (born 17 June 1971 in Ballarat, Australia) is Triple M Melbourne radio presenter. 

Williams received the nickname "Dangerous Dave" when the radio stunts he would do involved some element of danger. He has been nominated for an Australian Commercial Radio Awards 7 times but never won.  In 2013 he was awarded by Radio Today as 'Australia's Best Music Jock'.

Career
He has worked with Radio Personalities, Eddie McGuire, Mick Molloy, Kyle Sandilands, Jackie O, Dave Hughes, Wil Anderson, Tony Martin, Judith Lucy, Tracy Bartram, Peter Helliar & Myf Warhurst. 

Williams did work experience in his hometown of Ballarat at 3BA before beginning his radio career at 2LM in Lismore, New South Wales then became the first on air host of Triple Z Lismore, 

in 1996, he moved to Shepparton's Sun FM in Central Victoria before landing in Melbourne. Notable stations Fox FM, Nova 100, 2Day FM and Triple M Sydney.

References

External links
 
 

Radio personalities from Melbourne
Triple M presenters
1971 births
Living people